Andrey Ignatyevich Aldan-Semyonov (27 October 1908 – 8 December 1985) was a Russian writer, who was imprisoned in the Far Eastern Soviet Gulag camps from 1938 to 1953.  Along with Boris Dyakov and Yury Pilyar, he published his memoirs of Gulag life as part of the second wave of Russian literature on the Soviet camp experience, after Georgy Shelest published his Kolyma Notes and Alexander Solzhenitsyn his One Day in the Life of Ivan Denisovich.

References

Literature
 Казак В. Лексикон русской литературы XX века = Lexikon der russischen Literatur ab 1917. — Москва: РИК Культура, 1996. 

1908 births
1985 deaths
People from Urzhumsky District
People from Urzhumsky Uyezd
Russian memoirists
Russian prisoners and detainees
Prisoners and detainees of the Soviet Union
20th-century memoirists
Burials at Kuntsevo Cemetery